Thomas Murphy, commonly known as Tom Murphy, was an Irish footballer who played as a defender and made two appearances for the Irish Free State national team.

Career
Murphy was included in the Irish Free State squad for the 1924 Summer Olympic football tournament in Paris. Though he did not feature in the Olympics, he made two appearances for the team in friendly matches after Ireland's elimination from the tournament. The first match took place on 3 June 1924 against Estonia in Colombes, while the second took place in Dublin on 14 June against the United States. Both matches finished as 3–1 wins for Ireland.

Career statistics

International

References

Year of birth missing
Year of death missing
Republic of Ireland association footballers
Irish Free State association footballers
Olympic footballers of Ireland
Footballers at the 1924 Summer Olympics
Association football defenders
St James's Gate F.C. players
League of Ireland players